The sixteenth season of Dancing with the Stars premiered on 18 February 2019. Due to Network 10 obtaining the rights for the series, an overhaul to the cast and crew occurred, with Grant Denyer and Amanda Keller co-hosting the show, and Strictly Come Dancing judge Craig Revel Horwood and professional dancers Sharna Burgess and Tristan MacManus making up the judging panel.

Couples 
Network 10 revealed the first three celebrities participating in Dancing With the Stars to be Samuel Johnson, Curtly Ambrose & Cassandra Thorburn on 23 January 2019. All of the remaining celebrities were announced on 30 January 2019.

Scoring chart

  indicate the lowest score for each week
  indicate the highest score for each week
  the couple was eliminated that week
  the returning couple was last to be called safe
  the couple earned immunity, and could not be eliminated
  the couple withdrew from the competition that week
  the returning couple in the bottom two 
  the winning couple
  the runner-up couple
  the third-place couple

Averages 
Extra points from the dance-offs are not included and scores by guest judge Bindi Irwin during the individual round of week 7 are excluded.

Highest and lowest scoring performances 
The best and worst performances in each dance according to the judges' 30-point scale are as follows:

Couples' highest and lowest scoring dances

Scores are based upon a 30-point maximum.

Weekly scores
Unless indicated otherwise, individual judges scores in the charts below (given in parentheses) are listed in this order from left to right: Craig Revel Horwood, Sharna Burgess, Tristan MacManus.

Week 1
The couples performed cha-cha-cha, tango, viennese waltz or jive.

Running order

Week 2: My Jam Monday
The couples performed one unlearned dance to their favourite song. Samba and quickstep are introduced.
Running order

Week 3: Most Memorable Year
The couples performed one unlearned dance to celebrate the most memorable year of their lives. Contemporary, paso doble, rumba and foxtrot are introduced.
Running order

Week 4: Latin Night
The couples performed one unlearned Latin routine. Salsa and Argentine tango are introduced.

Running order

Week 5: Movie Night
The couples performed one unlearned dance and a team dance to a song from a famous movie.

Week 6: Dance-Off
The couples performed one unlearned dance. The couple with the highest score earned an immunity from elimination, while the rest of the couples participated in dance-offs for extra points. Jazz is introduced.

Grant Denyer did not appear as co-host; he was absent due to being in hospital. Eliminated contestant Denise Scott filled in for Denyer.

For each dance-off, the couple with the highest remaining score picked the opponent against whom they wanted to dance; the chosen opponent was allowed to pick the dance style (samba, cha-cha-cha or jive). The winner of each dance-off earned three points. The couple who won immunity, Courtney and Josh, received a five-point bonus.

Week 7: Judges' Team-up Challenge
Individual judges scores in the chart below (given in parentheses) are listed in this order from left to right: Craig Revel Horwood, Bindi Irwin, Sharna Burgess, Tristan MacManus

The couples performed one unlearned dance and also had to team-up to dance with another couple with one of the three judges. The judges designed and coached their teams and performed with them on the night, while the two non-performing judges and guest judge Bindi Irwin scored their routine.

The 2 couples with the lowest score would participate in an elimination dance-off where the judges chose who would continue to the next week.

Grant Denyer did not appear as co-host for the second week in a row; he was absent due to being in hospital. The Loop host & Studio 10 reporter Scott Tweedie filled in for Denyer.

Judges' votes to save

 Horwood: Jimmy & Alexandra
 Burgess: Jimmy & Alexandra
 MacManus: Did not vote, but would have voted to save Jimmy & Alexandra

Week 8: Trio Night
On April 8, 2019, it was announced a few hours before the show that Jimmy Rees had voluntarily left the competition due to personal reasons. As a result, no celebrity was voted out.

Grant Denyer did not appear as co-host for the third week in a row show; he was absent due to being in hospital. He is expected to be back for the semi-finals; Studio 10 co-host and eliminated contestant Denise Scott filled in a second time for Denyer.

Week 9: Semifinals
After a three-week absence recovering from a back injury, Grant Denyer returned as co-host.

In the first round, the contestants performed a redemption dance. In the second round, the contestants performed a fusion dance of two dance styles dedicated to a meaningful person in their life.

Judges' votes to save
 Horwood: Samuel & Jorja
 Burgess: Samuel & Jorja
 MacManus: Did not vote, but would have voted to save Jett & Lily

Week 10: Grand Finale
In the first round, the couples performed an 'encore dance' which is their favourite dance of the season. In the second round, they performed a freestyle routine.

The show also included a 'special guest' appearance by Australian singer and songwriter Conrad Sewell, who sang his songs Love Me Anyway & Healing Hands before the winner of the show was announced.

Dance chart 
The celebrities and professional partners danced one of these routines for each corresponding week:
 Week 1: Cha-Cha-Cha, Jive, Tango or Viennese Waltz
 Week 2 ("My Jam Monday"): One unlearned dance (introducing Quickstep and Samba)
 Week 3 (Most Memorable Year Night): One unlearned dance (introducing Contemporary, Foxtrot, Paso Doble and Rumba)
 Week 4 (Latin Night): One unlearned dance (introducing Salsa and Argentine Tango)
 Week 5 (Movie Night): One unlearned dance and team dances
 Week 6 (Dance-off): One unlearned dance (for immunity) and a dance-off (Jive, Samba or Cha-Cha-Cha, as chosen by opponents)
 Week 7 (Judges' Team Up Challenge): One unlearned dance and team up challenge
 Week 8 (Trio Night): One unlearned dance and a 'trio' dance with their partner & one of the eliminated professionals
 Week 9 (Semifinals): Redemption and fusion dance
 Week 10 (Grand Finale): Encore dance (repeat of favourite dance) & a freestyle routine

 Highest scoring dance
 Lowest scoring dance
 Not performed or scored
 Won Immunity challenge
 Lost Dance Off
 Won Dance Off
 Withdrew from the competition

Ratings

Notes

References

Season 16
2019 Australian television seasons